The Orissa Steelers are the winners of the Premier Hockey League 2007, India's only national league level Field Hockey tournament. The originally proposed name for the team was Rourkela Steelers after the city which is said to be the Hockey Capital of Orissa.

They participated in the tournament for the first time in 2006, when it had two tiers. They won the First Division (the other was Premier Division) title that year. In 2007, the two-tier system was replaced by a single-tier system in PHL, and Orissa Steelers was admitted as one of the seven teams. The others were Hyderabad Sultans, Maratha Warriors, Sher-e-Jalandhar, Chandigarh Dynamos, Chennai Veerans, and Bangalore Lions.

Orissa Steelers went on to win 10 of their 12 matches in the league level to top the table. In the best-of-three finals, they won the title and the prize money of Rs 4 million by beating Sher-e-Jalandhar twice while losing to them once. Dilip Tirkey, the captain of the Orissa Steelers, who also leads Indian national Hockey team, was awarded player of the tournament in PHL 2007.

Team in PHL 2007
Players
 Dilip Tirkey (Captain) 
 Salman Akbar (Goalkeeper) [Pakistan]
 Daman Deep Singh 
 Prabodh Tirkey 
 Roshan Minz
 Samir Dad  
 Sunil Ekka  
 Jitender Saroha  
 William Xalxo  
 Bimal Lakra  
 Jasbir Singh  
 Adnan Zakir [Pakistan]
 Mario Almada [Argentina]
 Tjeerd Steller  [Netherlands]
 Sunil Yadav  
 Bruno H Lugun  
 Birender Lakra 
 Prem Kumar 
 Dinesh Ekka  (Goalkeeper)

Officials
 A K Bansal (Chief Coach) 
 Pranab K Pattnaik (Asst. Coach) 
 Mukti Prasad Das (PT) 
 Pratap Satpathy (Manager)

Performance in 2007
League Level
Matches: 12; Won: 10; Lost: 2; Goals For: 29; Goals Against: 12; Points: 28; Position in League Table: No 1

Results At A Glance in 2007
League Level
 Won Against Chandigarh Dynamos 1-0 (Extra Time)
 Won Against Chennai Veerans 2-1
 Won Against Hyderabad Sultans 1-0
 Lost to Sher-e-Jalandhar 1-2
 Won Against Bangalore Lions 3-0
 Won Against Maratha Warriors 2-0
 Won Against Hyderabad Sultans 2-0
 Lost to Bangalore Lions 3-4
 Won Against Chandigarh Dynamos 4-2
 Won Against Sher-e-Jalandhar 4-2 (Extra Time; Shootout)
 Won Against Maratha Warriors 4-1
 Won Against Chennai Veerans 5-1

Finals
 Lost to Sher-e-Jalandhar in the penalty shootout
 Won Against Sher-e-Jalandhar 2-1
 Won Against Sher-e-Jalandhar 4-3

References

Indian field hockey clubs
Field hockey in Odisha
Premier Hockey League teams
Sports clubs in India
Year of establishment missing